Minuscule 445 (in the Gregory-Aland numbering), ε 603 (in the Soden numbering), is a Greek minuscule manuscript of the New Testament, on paper. It is dated by a colophon to the year 1506. It has marginalia.

Description 

The codex contains a complete text of the four Gospels on 194 paper leaves. It is written in one column per page, in 24 lines per page.

There is also a division according to the smaller Ammonian Sections (in Mark 241, 16:20). It has no references to the Eusebian Canons (written below Ammonian Section numbers).

It contains lectionary markings at the margin and incipits.

Text 

The Greek text of the codex is a representative of the Byzantine text-type. Aland placed it in Category V. It was not examined by Claremont Profile Method.

The text of the Matthew 16:2b–3 and Pericope Adulterae (John 7:53-8:11) are omitted.

History 

According to the colophon the manuscript was written in 1506, by hand Antonii eparchi. It once belonged to the Jesuit's Colleague, in Augen, on the Garonne. It was sold to Edward Harley on 28 July 1725. After his death it was bought for British Museum in 1753.

The manuscript was added to the list of New Testament manuscripts by Scholz (1794-1852). Scholz examined only Mark 5. C. R. Gregory saw it in 1883.

It is currently housed at the British Library (Harley MS 5736).

See also 

 List of New Testament minuscules
 Biblical manuscript
 Textual criticism

References

Further reading 

 Henri Omont, Notes sur les manuscrits grecs du British Museum, Bibliothèque de l'École des Chartes, 45 (1884), 314–50, 584 (p. 335).
 Summary Catalogue of Greek Manuscripts (London: British Library, 1999- ), I, pp. 184–5 [with further bibliography].

External links 
 Harley MS 5736 at the British Library

Greek New Testament minuscules
16th-century biblical manuscripts
Harleian Collection